Netela is handmade scarf-like two-layered cloth made of cotton worn by Ethiopian and Eritrean women. The netela is a well known and commonly worn garment in both countries. The male equivalent is known as the kuta. It is very thin and delicate, with the texture of gauze. The netela has only two layers and is quite large, measuring about 63 x 102 inches. It is white with colorful intricately woven borders called . The tibebe is between 1 and 2 inches at each end, with two variations: one composed of only one color, and the other of multiple colors and patterns.

The netela can be worn in different ways. For general wear, When going to church, the two layers of the netela are opened, and the border is folded over both shoulders instead of just the right shoulder. The netela covers the back and shoulders. When the border is worn around the face or shoulders, it is a sign of mourning, but in moments of leisure the border goes over the left shoulder.

The netela has become an important garment to the Ethiopian diaspora due to the military coup in 1973.

There are other textiles similar to the netela. Fotas usually have checkerboard designs and are simply wrapped around the shoulders or over the head as a shawl. There is a third kind of textile called , which is a very long cotton sash with a border in color; it is only worn by married women. There are types that can measure up to 26 feet long.

See also
 Bernos
 Gabi (clothing)

References

Eritrean clothing
Ethiopian clothing
Shawls and wraps